The 2015 Maltese Super Cup was the 31st Maltese Super Cup, an annual football match played between the winners of the previous season's Maltese Premier League and the FA Trophy. The match was contested by Hibernians, champions of the 2014–15 Maltese Premier League, and Birkirkara, winners of the 2014–15 FA Trophy against the same Hibernians. Played as the first official game of the season at Ta' Qali National Stadium on 12 August 2015, Hibernians came from behind to win 2–1, making it their third title in eleven appearances.

Match

Details

See also 
 2015–16 Maltese Premier League
 2015–16 Maltese FA Trophy

References 

1
2015–16 in European football
2015 in association football
Maltese Super Cup